Sam Yan is the name of an intersection and its nearby neighbourhood in Bangkok, Thailand. It connects Rama IV Road with Phaya Thai and Si Phraya roads, and is located within Pathum Wan District, next to its border with Bang Rak. The neighbourhood lies in the intersection's northwest corner on land owned by Chulalongkorn University, and is famous for its restaurants.

Location
Sam Yan Intersection is where Rama IV (which runs in a roughly east-west direction) meets Phaya Thai Road to the north and Si Phraya Road to the southwest. Originally consisting only of an at-grade intersection, the Thai–Japan Flyover Bridge, constructed in 1992, now allows Rama IV traffic to bypass Sam Yan, as well as the eastward Henri Dunant and Sala Daeng intersections.

The intersection area is served by the Sam Yan Station of the MRT, which connects to the Chamchuri Square complex and Samyan Mitrtown in the intersections' northeastern and northwestern corners, respectively. Wat Hua Lamphong sits on the intersection's southeastern corner, while the large campus of Chulalongkorn University lies alongside Phaya Thai Road to the north of the intersection.

Tai Sia Huk Chou Shrine, a white Chinese shrine dedicated to Sun Wukong is on Phaya Thai Road front of Chamchuri Square.

History
The neighbourhood known as Sam Yan lies in the northwest corner of the intersection. The university began developing the area's real estate for rent in 1963, and until the late 2000s, the neighbourhood consisted of various shophouses which held many well-known restaurants. At the heart of the neighbourhood was Sam Yan Market, a permanent foodstuff marketplace established in 1965, whose cheap upstairs restaurants were popular with students. In 2008 the university, which owns and manages the area's real estate through its Office of Property Management, began work on development plans which required the demolition of old establishments at the immediate intersection. Sam Yan Market was relocated a few hundred metres away to the northwest nearer Suphachalasai Stadium, and most shop owners followed. The plot of land was finally developed into the Samyan Mitrtown mixed-use project by Golden Land Property Development, and opened in 2019.

The name "Sam Yan" can be translated as "three quarters", probably referring to the meeting point of the three roads.

Sam Yan, together with the adjacent Suan Luang neighbourhood (also on university land), continues to be well known as a gastronomic destination. Sam Yan, together with Suan Luang, was named the "coolest neighbourhood" in Bangkok by Time Out magazine in 2020.

References

Neighbourhoods of Bangkok
Road junctions in Bangkok
Property Management of Chulalongkorn University
Pathum Wan district